Kobylnik may refer to:

 Kobylnik, Złotów County
 Stary Kobylnik
 Nowy Kobylnik
 Narach (village), aka Kobylnik or Kobylniki